Barrutia is a surname. Notable people with the surname include:

Antonio Barrutia (1933–2021), Spanish cyclist
Cosme Barrutia (1929–2005), Spanish cyclist